Tyloxoles is a genus of beetles in the family Cerambycidae, containing the following species:

 Tyloxoles boholicus Kriesche, 1927
 Tyloxoles discordans Newman, 1842
 Tyloxoles javanicus Breuning, 1960

References

Apomecynini